Aleksandar Paločević (Serbian Cyrillic: Александар Палочевић; born 22 August 1993) is a Serbian professional footballer who plays as an attacking midfielder for South Korean club FC Seoul.

Club career
Paločević progressed through OFK Beograd's youth system, making his senior debuts while on loan at Sinđelić Beograd in 2011. He also went on loan to Voždovac, before returning to OFK Beograd in early 2013. On 27 May 2015, Paločević signed a two-year contract with Vojvodina. He was selected in the 2016–17 Serbian SuperLiga Team of the Season due to his performances in the process.

In the summer of 2017, Paločević moved abroad and joined the Portuguese club Arouca.

In July 2018, Paločević signed a three-year contract with Nacional.

In June 2019, Paločević joined South Korean side Pohang Steelers on a one-and-a-half-year loan.

On 18 January 2021, Paločević signed a contract with K League 1 side FC Seoul.

International career
Paločević made his full international debut for Serbia on 29 January 2017, captaining the side in a goalless draw against the United States.

Honours
Individual
 Serbian SuperLiga Team of the Season: 2016–17
 K League 1 Best XI: 2020

References

External links
 
 
 
 

1993 births
Living people
People from Gjilan
Kosovo Serbs
Serbian footballers
Serbian expatriate footballers
Serbia international footballers
Association football midfielders
OFK Beograd players
FK Sinđelić Beograd players
FK Voždovac players
FK Vojvodina players
F.C. Arouca players
C.D. Nacional players
Pohang Steelers players
FC Seoul players
Serbian First League players
Serbian SuperLiga players
Liga Portugal 2 players
Primeira Liga players
K League 1 players
Serbian expatriate sportspeople in Portugal
Expatriate footballers in Portugal
Serbian expatriate sportspeople in South Korea
Expatriate footballers in South Korea